Euphorbia nutans is a species of Euphorbia known by the common names eyebane and nodding spurge. It is native to much of the United States, Eastern Canada, Mexico, Central America, the Caribbean, and Venezuela.

It is reportedly naturalized in parts of Europe as well as in the Middle East, Japan, and New Zealand. It has also been introduced to California. It can be a noxious weed in areas where it has been introduced. As a weed it generally occurs on disturbed ground, or in ornamental flower beds.

Description
Euphorbia nutans is an annual herb growing erect with pairs of oblong leaves along its stems.

The inflorescence may be solitary or borne in clusters. Each inflorescence is a cyathium, with flat white or red appendages surrounding the actual flowers. At the center of the array of appendages are several staminate flowers surrounding one pistillate flower.

References

External links
Jepson Manual Treatment (TJM2) of Euphorbia nutans
USDA Plants Profile for Chamaesyce nutans (eyebane)
Chamaesyce nutans — UC Photos gallery

nutans
Flora of Central America
Flora of Mexico
Flora of the Caribbean
Flora of Eastern Canada
Flora of the Northeastern United States
Flora of the Southeastern United States
Flora of the United States
Flora of Venezuela
Flora of California
Flora of New Mexico
Flora of the Appalachian Mountains
Flora of the Sonoran Deserts
Natural history of the California chaparral and woodlands
Natural history of the Colorado Desert
Natural history of the Peninsular Ranges
Natural history of the Transverse Ranges
Plants described in 1816
Flora without expected TNC conservation status